Martina Gedeck (born 14 September 1961) is a German actress. She came to broader, international attention due to her roles in films such as Mostly Martha (2001), The Lives of Others (2006), and The Baader Meinhof Complex (2008). She has won numerous awards, including the Deutscher Filmpreis in 1997 for Supporting Actress in Life is All You Get, and in 2002 for Actress in Mostly Martha.

Biography
Gedeck was born 14 September 1961 in Munich, Bavaria, West Germany, and grew up in Bavaria, the oldest of three girls. In 1971, her family moved to Berlin, where the eleven-year-old debuted as an actress in children's television shows. There seems to be some uncertainty regarding her year of birth 1961.

After graduating school in 1981, she enrolled at the Free University of Berlin, majoring in German Literature and History. From 1982 to 1986, Martina attended acting classes at the Berlin University of the Arts. During that time, she made her stage debut at the Theater am Turm in Frankfurt. Gedeck performed regularly at the Deutsches Schauspielhaus in Hamburg, and appeared in plays in Basel, Berlin, Frankfurt, and Hamburg.

In 1994, Gedeck gained the attention of film audiences with her performance in Sönke Wortmann's hit comedy Maybe... Maybe Not (Der bewegte Mann). In 1995, Gedeck received critical praise for her award-winning performance in the television drama . In 1997, she furthered her reputation with her performance as Lilo in Wolfgang Becker's Life is All You Get (Das Leben ist eine Baustelle). In 1997, she received the German Film Award for Best Actress in a Supporting Role for her performance as a shy waitress in Helmut Dietl's . By the end of the 1990s, Gedeck had established herself as "one of the most prolific character actresses in Germany" with ambitious feature films such as Jew-Boy Levi (Viehjud Levi) and television dramas like Dominik Graf's Your Best Years (Deine besten Jahre). She garnered awards and nominations throughout this period of her career.

Gedeck's international breakthrough came with her performance in Sandra Nettelbeck's Mostly Martha (Bella Martha). In the film, she plays a workaholic chef who is forced to adjust to major changes in her personal and professional life that are beyond her control. The film won the Créteil International Women's Film Festival Grand Prix Award, and the Goya Award for Best European Film in 2002. It also received a German Film Award Nomination for Outstanding Feature Film. For her performance, Gedeck received a European Film Award Nomination for Best Actress (2002), the German Film Award for Outstanding Individual Achievement for Actress (2002), and the German Film Critics Association Award for Best Actress (2003).

In 2006, Gedeck appeared in five major films: The Elementary Particles (2006) as Christiane, The Lives of Others (2006) as Christa-Maria Sieland, The Perfect Friend (2006) as Marlène, Summer '04 (2006) as Miriam Franz, and Robert De Niro's The Good Shepherd (2006) as Hanna Schiller, starring opposite Matt Damon and John Turturro. The Lives of Others won the Academy Award for Best Foreign Language Film.

In 2008, Gedeck played the role of Ulrike Meinhof in The Baader Meinhof Complex. In 2010, Gedeck, who is affiliated with the Green Party, served as an elector in the Federal Assembly to elect the new President of Germany. That year, she appeared in Jew Suss: Rise and Fall and Agnosía.

In 2012, she appeared in The Wall and The Door, and in 2013, she appeared in The Nun and Night Train to Lisbon. Gedeck resides in Berlin with her partner, Swiss director Markus Imboden. In 2013 she was named as a member of the jury at the 70th Venice International Film Festival.

Filmography

Television
 Der Fahnder - TV series, 1 episode (1988), as Stephanie
 Goldjunge (1988), as Brigitte Katzbach
 Die Beute (1988), as Nelly
 Schulz & Schulz – TV series, 5 episodes (1989–1993), as Britta
 Hausmänner (1991), as Helen
 Mutter und Söhne (1992), as Susanne Stoller
 Leo und Charlotte (1993), as Sylvie
  (1993), as Bronka
  (1995), as Wanda
  (1995), as Hölleisengretl
 Der Schönste Tag im Leben (1996), as Waltraut
 Lea Katz - Die Kriminalpsychologin: Einer von uns (1997), as Lea Katz
 Lea Katz - Die Kriminalpsychologin: Das wilde Kind (1997), as Lea Katz
 Der Neffe (1997), as Isabella
 Bella Block – TV series, episode "Tod eines Mädchens" (1997), as Frau Meng
  (1997), as Kati Treichl
  (1998, TV miniseries), as Elvira
 Die beste Party - Heimatabend 1999 (1999)
 Ich habe nein gesagt (1999), as Doris Wengler
 Your Best Years (1999), as Vera Kemp
 Happy Hour oder Glück und Glas (2000), as Greta Steinwender / Ladiner
  (2000), as Kati Treichl
 Romeo (2001), as Lotte Zimmermann
 Private Lies (Scheidung auf amerikanisch) (2001), as Sarah
 Jenseits der Liebe (2001), as Helen Dubbs
 Die Mutter (2002), as Vera Zardiss
 Verlorenes Land (2002), as Maria
   (2002), as Lebzelter-Mariandl
 Geheime Geschichten (2003)
 Unsre Mutter ist halt anders (2003), as Paula
 Schattenlinie (2003), as Clara Lorenz
 Das Blaue Wunder (2004), as Thea Eiselt
  (2004), as Brigitte Reimann
 Feuer in der Nacht (2004), as Paola Winkler
  (2004), as Anne Stein
 Giacomo Casanova (2004), as Madame De Roll
  (2005), as Prof. Sara M. Kardow
  (2006), as Paula Schmitt
 Verlassen (2007), as Claudia
 Sisi (2009), as Erzherzogin Sophie von Habsburg
 Tatort (2010)
 Halbe Hundert (2012)
  (2013), as Judith Furmann
 Tannbach (2015) as Hilde Vöckler
 Seit du da bist (2016), as Clara
  (2016), as Staatsanwältin Frau Nelson
 Arthurs Gesetz - TV miniseries, 6 episodes (2018), as Martha Ahnepol / Muriel
 Herzjagen (2019), as Caroline Binder
 Oktoberfest: Beer and Blood - TV miniseries, 6 episodes (2020), as Maria Hoflinger

Cinema
 Tiger, Lion, Panther (1989), as Nicoletta/Lion
 Hard Days, Hard Nights (1989), as Goldi
 Der bewegte Mann (1994), as Jutta
 Talk of the Town (1995), as Sabine Kirsch
 How I've Got Rhythm (short film, 1995), as Susanne
  (1997), as Rica Reichmann
  (1997), as Serafina
 Life is All You Get (1997), as Lilo
 Women Don't Lie (1998), as Hannah
  (1998), as Czerni
 Jew-Boy Levi (1999), as Fräulein Neuner
 Alles Bob! (1999), as Barbara
 The Green Desert (1999), as Doris
 Mostly Martha (2001), as Martha Klein
 Atomised (2006), as Christiane
 The Lives of Others (2006), as Christa-Maria Sieland
 The Perfect Friend (2006), as Marlène
 Summer '04 (2006), as Miriam Franzj
 The Good Shepherd (2006), as Hanna Schiller
 Messy Christmas (2007), as Sara
 Geliebte Clara (2008), as Clara Schumann
 The Baader Meinhof Complex (2008), as Ulrike Meinhof
 Bets and Wedding Dresses (2009), as Josephine Campanella
 Jew Suss: Rise and Fall (2010), as Anna Marian
 Agnosía (2010), as Prevert
 Bastard (2011), as Claudia Meinert
 The Wall (2012), as the woman
 The Door (2012), as Magda
 The Nun (La Religieuse, 2013), as Suzanne's mother
 Night Train to Lisbon (2013), as Mariana
 Those Happy Years (2013), as Helke
  (2014, as Corianna Kleist
 The Girl King (2015), as Maria Eleonara of Brandenburg
 I'm Off Then (2015), as Stella
 Das Tagebuch der Anne Frank (2016), as Edith Frank
  (2016), as Helene Brindel
 Wir töten Stella (2017), as Anna
 Zwei Herren im Anzug (2018), as Theres
 Und wer nimmt den Hund? (2019), as Doris Lehnert
  (2020), as Frauke Abeck, Julies Mutter
 Dark Satellites (2022)

Awards and nominations

References

External links

 Private homepage: https://martina-gedeck.com

German film actresses
German television actresses
Actresses from Munich
Best Actress German Film Award winners
1961 births
Living people
20th-century German actresses
21st-century German actresses